The Network of Conservation Educators and Practitioners (NCEP) is a project developed by the Center for Biodiversity and Conservation (CBC) of the American Museum of Natural History (AMNH) and its partners around the world. NCEP is a global initiative, currently active in Bolivia, Laos, Madagascar, Mexico, Myanmar, Peru, Rwanda, the United States, the Solomon Islands, and Vietnam.

Goals 

The project's stated goals are to:

 Develop and disseminate open educational resources on managing and sustaining biological and cultural diversity;
 Foster an active approach to teaching and learning that models the realities of professional practice; and
 Create global opportunities for communication and interaction among conservation educators and practitioners.

Teaching modules 

One of the project’s tangible products is a series of multi-component open educational resources, or modules, for teachers.

Each module includes a Synthesis document that brings together key concepts, applications, and literature for a topic, as well as an easily modified visual Presentation, and a practical Exercise for laboratory or field use. Exercise solutions and teaching notes are also provided for the instructor, as are learning goals and student assessment questions. In addition, interdisciplinary Case Studies integrate key concepts and questions that span the topics of more than one module. The modules are flexible and adaptable resources for professors and trainers in the field of biodiversity conservation and are tailored to the context where they will be used in terms of language and examples. They model the richly interconnected, interdisciplinary, and rapidly evolving nature of the field of conservation biology, and focus on developing the skills needed to decide when, how, and why a tool is the best choice for a particular conservation application. At present, more than 100 complete or partial modules are available for use and testing in several languages (English, Spanish, French, and Lao), and this number is expected to continue to grow. Modules are distributed free of cost to the users, and are available in printed form, on CD-ROM, and in electronic form via the Internet (http://ncep.amnh.org).

Workshops 

Individual educators at any location with Internet access may participate by simply downloading and using NCEP materials free of charge. However, in several countries, the CBC and its local partners are following a more intensive implementation strategy, with workshops and training events that bring educators and conservation practitioners together for a variety of purposes. In some cases, workshops are held to review and adapt existing modules to the context of a particular country. In other cases, workshops facilitate the production of new modules, or present new modules for discussion and evaluation by faculty peers. Finally, some workshops are focused on how modules can be used, and in particular, on how the principles of active teaching and learning embedded in NCEP module structure and content can be effectively used in the classroom to improve how conservation biology is taught. Since 2001, the CBC and its partners have held more than 70 NCEP workshops and training events in fifteen countries, reaching a total of more than 1500 faculty members, practitioners, and students.

Lessons in Conservation 

In 2007, NCEP began publishing the freely available online journal, Lessons in Conservation (LinC; http://ncep.amnh.org/linc). The journal is published electronically (downloaded as a PDF) and is released periodically; it features selected NCEP educational materials. Currently, only one issue has been released with materials from the NCEP modules: Introduction to Marine Conservation Biology, Assessing Threats to Conservation Planning and Management, Ecosystem Loss and Fragmentation, and Biodiversity Conservation and Integrated Conservation and Development Projects (ICDPs).  The journal is co-edited by Eleanor Sterling and Nora Bynum.

References 

(1) Brian E. Hagenbuch, Nora Bynum, Eleanor Sterling, Anne H. Bower, John A. Cigliano, Barbara J. Abraham, Christine Engels, John F. Mull, John D. Pierce, Michelle L. Zjhra, Jennifer M. Rhode, Stuart R. Ketcham, and Margaret-Ann Mayer. In Press. Evaluating a Multi-Component Assessment Framework for Biodiversity Education. Teaching Issues and Experiments in Ecology, Vol. 6: Research #3 [online].

(2) Brian E. Hagenbuch et al., 2007. Expanding assessment and learning in biodiversity conservation education: A methodological framework. The ESA/SER Joint Meeting (August 5 -- August 10, 2007) http://eco.confex.com/eco/2007/techprogram/P6091.HTM

(3) Bynum, N., and A.L. Porzecanski. 2004. Educación para la Conservación en Bolivia. Ecología en Bolivia 39 (1): 1-4. http://editorenjefe.ecologiabolivia.googlepages.com/Editorial39-1.pdf

(4) Matthew I. Palmer et al., 2008. Evaluating learning gains from conservation exercises across multiple institutions. The 93rd ESA Annual Meeting (August 3 -- August 8, 2008) http://eco.confex.com/eco/2008/techprogram/P13967.HTM

(5) M. Mendez, A. Gómez, N. Bynum, R. Medellín, A. L. Porzecanski, E. Sterling. 2007. Conservation Education in Latin America: availability of formal academic programs in conservation biology. Conservation Biology 21 (6): 1399-1403. 

(6) Porzecanski, A. L., N. Bynum, J. L. Mena, y R. A. Medellín. 2006. La Red de Educadores y Profesionales de la Conservación (REPC): la implementación de un proyecto internacional de educación superior en México. Contributed chapter in A. Barahona and L. Almeida, eds., Educación para la Conservación. Facultad de Ciencias, Universidad Nacional Autónoma de México, México.

(7) Sterling, E., N. Bynum, J. P. Gibbs, and A. L. Porzecanski. 2005. Construyendo Capacidades para la Conservación de la Biodiversidad en Países Tropicales: La Red de Educadores y Profesionales de la Conservación (REPC). Ambiente y Desarrollo 21 (2): 40-46. http://www.cipma.cl/RAD/2005/2_Sterling.pdf

External links 

 http://www.conbio.org/activities/meetings/2006/NCEP.cfm
 http://www.wcs.org/globalconservation/Asia/laos/laocurriculumenrichment
 http://www.sencer.net/Outreach/centers.cfm
 http://lilyheart.wordpress.com/2008/01/16/lessons-in-conservation-2/
 http://www.idealist.org/if/i/en/av/Org/192262-195/c
 http://www.ibabuzz.com/garybogue/2008/01/09/free-biodiversity-resources-thinking-for-educators-students/
 http://www.unmsm.edu.pe/veterinaria/Taller%20de%20Capacitacion%20Docente%20REPC%202008.htm
 http://ncep.amnh.org/

Nature conservation organizations based in the United States